Rodolfo Zapata (born 1 May 1966) is an Argentine Football Association coach and former player.

Career

Playing career
Rodolfo Zapata started out as a player in the Argentinian 2nd division. He played as goalkeeper in Huracán, Sportivo Italiano, Racing de Olavarría, Club Atlético San Miguel and Cipolletti de Rio Negro.  Due to consecutive knee injures, Zapata retired from playing and he started his coaching career.

Managerial career

Canada
In 2000, Zapata taught seminars for coaches and players development in the cities of Calgary and Edmonton that were promoted by Alberta Soccer Association.  He planned and coordinated activities of coaching staff. Also he provided recommendations that balance the needs of both recreational and competitive program design.

United States

In 2001–2002, he was Head Coach of United Nations International School in New York City.

Also in New York and New Jersey, he was Head Coach of USA Olympic Development Program (2001-2009).  This is a national process for identifying and developing the best youth football players, which represent the United States in international competitions, such as the World Cup and the Olympics.

In September 2012, Zapata returned to the United States as Head Coach of United States Youth Soccer Association and New Jersey Youth Soccer Association.  His role was to concentrate on the identification and recruitment of the best young players. Many of them have gone on to represent the USA Youth National Teams in various age categories.

Sunshine Stars FC (Nigeria)

In January 2010, he was based in Akure City, where he was Head Coach of Nigeria Professional Football League side Sunshine Stars FC.

MP Black Aces (South Africa)

In 2011–2012 season, Rodolfo was appointed to be Head Coach of MP Black Aces FC in South Africa.

Gaborone United (Botswana)
In 2016–2018, Zapata was Head Coach of Gaborone United in the Botswana Premier League.

AFC Leopards (Kenya)
In May 2018, AFC Leopards announced Rodolfo Zapata as their new head coach for the remainder of the Kenyan Premier League season.

Township Rollers FC (Botswana)
In 2019, he was appointed as the new head coach of Township Rollers FC in Botswana.

Rodolfo Zapata won the 2018–2019 edition of the Botswana Premier League with his club.  As a result, Township Rollers qualified for the 2019–2020 Africa Champions League.

As Head Coach of Township Rollers FC, Zapata has overseen a possession-based and attacking style of play.  He has most consistently favored a 4-1-4-1 formation, but there have also been occasions when both a 4-3-2-1 and 4-3-3 have been used.  Notably, represent subtle positional changes from Rollers' 4-1-4-1 tactic.

Mukura Victory Sports (Rwanda)
In March 2021, Zapata joined Mukura Victory Sports in the Rwanda Premier League.

References

External links
 All you need to know about Rodolfo Zapata in 90 seconds
 Salida laboral ¿Qué pasa, por ejemplo, cuando no conseguís trabajo en tu país?
 Zapata, el argentino que triunfa en Botswana
 AFC Leopards is destined for a better future
 Nigeria National Team: Argentine Coach is a new NFF candidate
 Gaborone United is an attractive team
 Gaborone United make football look easy
 Rodolfo Zapata en el Africa profunda
 I will never tolerate unwillingness or even the apathy of only one player, coach Rodolfo Zapata said
 Botswana football: Can Rodolfo Zapata pull Gaborone United out of the red?
 Witbank Spurs want to avenge last years Nedbank Cup loss to MP Black Aces
 Na Nigéria, técnico argentino dá dicas a Maradona
 Las claves del primer rival
 La Seleccion de Nigeria es floja en defensa
 Messi no luce porque no tiene asimilado el concepto de equipo
 TNT Sports Argentina: Futbol for Export Rodolfo Zapata
 COACH RODOLFO ZAPATA - Sunshine Stars FC, Nigeria Premier League

Argentine football managers
Expatriate football managers in Nigeria
Expatriate football managers in Kenya
Expatriate soccer managers in South Africa
Expatriate soccer managers in the United States
Expatriate soccer managers in Canada
Expatriate football managers in Botswana
Argentine expatriate football managers
1966 births
Living people
Expatriate football managers in Rwanda
Argentine expatriate sportspeople in Rwanda
Argentine expatriate sportspeople in Botswana
Argentine expatriate sportspeople in Canada
Argentine expatriate sportspeople in South Africa
Argentine expatriate sportspeople in Kenya
Argentine expatriate sportspeople in the United States
Argentine expatriate sportspeople in Nigeria
A.F.C. Leopards managers